Traeger is a German surname. Notable people with the surname include:

Albert Traeger (1830-1912), German politician
Alfred Traeger (1895–1980), Australian inventor of the pedal wireless
Carsten Träger (born 1973), German politician
Elinor Meissner Traeger (1906-1983), American composer, pianist, and writer
Ronald Traeger (1936-1968), American fashion photographer
Tessa Traeger (born 1938), British photographer
William Isham Traeger (1880-1935), Sheriff of Los Angeles County

Fictional characters:
Chris Traeger
Tig Trager

See also
Treger (disambiguation)
Traeger Park
Trager Approach

German-language surnames

de:Traeger